The Senior National Hockey Championship is a state-level national field hockey competition contested by the state associations and government institutions under Hockey India, the sport's governing body in India. It was first held in 1928 under the aegis of Indian Hockey Federation (IHF), the former Indian field hockey federation and was also known as Rangaswamy Cup. Since 2011, it has been organised by Hockey India under the name of Hockey India Senior National Championship.

The 2022 senior championship was won by Haryana who defeated Tamil Nadu to win their second national title.

History
In 1928, the Indian Hockey Federation organised the first National Championship at Calcutta which was won by United Provinces. The competition was held biennially until 1944 following which it was held annually. During the Indian hockey team tour to New Zealand in 1935, the Maoris offered a shield to the team which was hence awarded to the winners of the National Championships. This shield won by Punjab in 1947 but was never returned by Pakistan following partition. In 1951, Madras hosted the National Championships for the first time and a new trophy was donated by the proprietors of The Hindu group.

Results

Men's championships
The results of the Senior National Hockey Championship:

Women's championships

Performance by teams

Men's

Women's

References

External links
Hockey India

Field hockey in India
Field hockey competitions in India
Recurring sporting events established in 1928